Somalia competed at the 2019 African Games held from 19 to 31 August 2019 in Rabat, Morocco. In total, athletes representing Somalia competed in three sports and did not win any medals.

Athletics 

Somalia had two male competitors compete in athletics; Abdirashid Yusuf Ali who competed in the men's 800 metres and Abdullahi Jama Mohamed who participated in the men's 1500 metres.

Abdirashid Yusuf Ali did not qualify to compete in the semifinals and Abdullahi Jama Mohamed finished in 9th place in the final.

Boxing 

Four men and one women, Ramla Said Ahmed Ali, represented Somalia in the Boxing events at the games. On Ahmed Ali competed in the Women's featherweight event. On 24 August, she lost her match against Marcelat Sakobi Matshu of the Democratic Republic of the Congo.

Taekwondo 

Somalia had three women and one man, Abdulahi Faud Dahir, participate in Taekwondo at the games in 2019.

Notes

References

External links 
  
 NOC Overview – Somalia

Nations at the 2019 African Games
African Games
2019